Guillermo Pacheco (born 23 December 1954) is a Peruvian former freestyle swimmer. He competed in two events at the 1972 Summer Olympics.

References

External links
 

1954 births
Living people
Peruvian male freestyle swimmers
Olympic swimmers of Peru
Swimmers at the 1972 Summer Olympics
Place of birth missing (living people)
20th-century Peruvian people